The Men's 52 kg powerlifting event at the 2004 Summer Paralympics was competed  on 21 September. It was won by Osama El Serngawy, representing .

Final round

21 Sept. 2004, 17:15

References

M